Auki Gwaunaru'u Airport  is an airport located a dozen kilometers to the north of Auki, which is the capital of the Malaita Province on the north-west coast of Malaita Island, one of the largest among the Solomon Islands.

Airlines and destinations

External links
Solomon Air Routes

Airports in the Solomon Islands